Srdjan Božić  (born April 22, 1984) is a Serbian former professional basketball player.

Career
In 2008, Božić signed with 1. deild karla club KFÍ. On 15 March 2008, he scored a season high 27 points in a 91–92 victory against Þór Þorlákshöfn.

References

External links
Profile at Eurobasket.com
Profile at realgm.com
Profile at proballers.com

1984 births
Living people
Basketball League of Serbia players
KK Prokuplje players
KK Rabotnički players
KK Sloga players
KK Sloboda Užice players
Serbian expatriate basketball people in Belarus
Serbian expatriate basketball people in Bosnia and Herzegovina
Serbian expatriate basketball people in Iceland
Serbian expatriate basketball people in Slovenia
Serbian expatriate basketball people in North Macedonia
Serbian men's basketball players
Sportspeople from Užice
Vestri men's basketball players
Guards (basketball)